Pitiquito Municipality is a municipality in Sonora in north-western Mexico.

Neighboring municipalities
Neighboring municipalities are Altar to the northwest, Hermosillo to the south, Trincheras to the east, and Caborca and the Gulf of California to the west.  The town of Pitiquito is located in the north of the municipality on Federal Highway 2.

Localities
There are 328 localities, the largest of which are:

References

Municipalities of Sonora